is a former Japanese football player.

Playing career
Kamimura was born in Gunma Prefecture on March 16, 1976. After graduating from Senshu University, he joined Japan Football League club Omiya Ardija in 1998. He played many matches as right side back from first season and the club was promoted to J2 League from 1999. In 2000, he became a regular player. However his opportunity to play decreased in 2002 and he retired end of 2002 season.

Club statistics

References

External links

1976 births
Living people
Senshu University alumni
Association football people from Gunma Prefecture
Japanese footballers
J2 League players
Japan Football League (1992–1998) players
Omiya Ardija players
Association football defenders